Billie Sol Estes (January 10, 1925 – May 14, 2013) was an American businessman and financier best known for his involvement in a business fraud scandal that complicated his ties to friend and future U.S. President Lyndon Johnson.

Early life
Estes was born January 10, 1925, to John and Lillian Estes on a farm near Clyde, Texas, one of six children. Estes never attended college but nonetheless demonstrated a natural talent for business from an early age.

He served in the U.S. Merchant Marine during World War II.

Fraud schemes

In the late 1950s, Estes was heavily involved in the Texas anhydrous ammonia business. He produced mortgages on nonexistent ammonia tanks by convincing local farmers to purchase them on credit, sight unseen, and leasing them from the farmers for the same amount as the mortgage payment, paying them a convenience fee as well. He used the fraudulent mortgage holdings to obtain loans from banks outside Texas who were unable to easily check on the tanks.

At the same time, United States Department of Agriculture began controlling the price of cotton, specifying quotas to farmers. The program included an acreage allotment that normally was not transferable from the land it was associated with, but which could be transferred if the original land was taken by eminent domain.

Estes worked out a method to purchase large numbers of cotton allotments by dealing with farmers who had been dispossessed of land through eminent domain. He convinced the farmers to purchase land from him in Texas and transfer their allotments there, with a mortgage agreement delaying the first payment for a year. Then he would lease the land and allotments back from the farmer for $50 per acre. Once the first payment came due, the farmer would intentionally default and the land would revert to Estes; in effect, Estes had purchased the cotton allotments with the lease fees. However, because the original sale and mortgage were a pretext rather than a genuine sale, it was illegal to transfer the cotton allotments this way. Estes, however, a smooth talker revered by many of his fellow members of the Churches of Christ, asserted the allegations as politics.

In 1962, after information came to light that Estes had paid off four Agriculture officials for grain storage contracts, President John F. Kennedy ordered the Justice Department and FBI to open investigations into Estes' activities and determine if Secretary of Agriculture Orville L. Freeman had also been "compromised" (Freeman was cleared). Congress conducted hearings on Estes' business dealings, including some that led to Vice President Johnson, a long-time associate of Estes.

In 1963 Estes was tried and convicted on charges related to the fraudulent ammonia tank mortgages on both federal and state charges and was sentenced to 24 years in prison. His state conviction was later overturned by the United States Supreme Court in Estes v. Texas, . His appeal hinged upon the alleged impossibility of a fair trial due to the presence of television cameras and broadcast journalists in the courtroom. He prevailed by a 5–4 vote. Estes was paroled in 1971. Eight years later, he was convicted of other fraud charges and served four more years. 

Oscar Griffin Jr., the journalist who uncovered the storage tank scandal, later received the 1963 Pulitzer Prize for his articles for a weekly newspaper in Pecos, Texas. To improve his 1961 candidacy for Reeves County school board, Estes offered the local newspaper large advertising buys in exchange for not opposing him. The Pecos Independent responded with an editorial that said, "We will put our advertising columns up for sale, as will any other newspaper, but we WILL NOT sell our editorial support." In response, Estes launched the rival Pecos Daily News on August 1, 1961. He spent about $600,000 and the Independent lost $400,000. It was nearly bankrupt when Griffin, its editor, ran (February 12, 1962) the first of four articles describing Estes's fraud but without naming him. Estes was arrested ten days after the last article ran in March. After his arrest, the Daily News went into receivership and the Independent bought it and merged the two newspapers into the Pecos Enterprise. When Griffin died in 2011, Estes remarked, "It's a good riddance that he left this world."

Allegations linking Johnson to the assassination of Kennedy and others
Estes also alleged in the 1980s that he had inside knowledge that Johnson was involved in the assassination of Kennedy. In 1984, he provided a voluntary statement to a grand jury in Texas alleging that the homicide of Henry Marshall, a key investigator in the Department of Agriculture case, was perpetrated by Malcolm Wallace, an aide to Johnson, upon orders from the then-Vice President. Estes claimed that Johnson was involved in the fraud schemes and had the official killed to prevent him from exposing Johnson's role. Two former Johnson associates responded to the allegations stating Estes was a "pathological liar". When the Department of Justice asked for more information, Estes responded that he would provide information on eight other murders ordered by Johnson, including the assassination of Kennedy, in exchange for immunity from prosecution and a pardon. According to Estes, Johnson set up the assassination to become president.

Estes reiterated the claim in, JFK Le Dernier Témoin: Assassinat De Kennedy, Enfin La Vérité! ("JFK The Last Witness: Kennedy's Assassination, Finally The Truth!"), a book he co-wrote with a French writer in 2003. He said that he was not interested in writing the book—published only in France—but that he was offered "a few hundred thousand dollars" to contribute to it. According to the Associated Press, the allegation was "rejected by prominent historians, Johnson aides and family members."

Death
Estes died at his home in DeCordova, Texas, on May 14, 2013, at the age of 88.

References

Further reading
 Chapter 3 discusses Estes's initial success in agriculture and subsequent turn to illegal activities.
 Demaret, Kent (April 23, 1979) "Billie Sol Estes May Face New Fraud Charges, but He's Never Up the Creek Without a Paddle" People
 Duscha, Julius (1964) Taxpayers' Hayride: The Farm Problem from the New Deal to the Billie Sol Estes Case Little, Brown, Boston, Massachusetts, 
 Estes, Billie Sol (2004) Billie Sol Estes: a Texas Legend BS Production, Granbury, Texas, ; an autobiography
 Estes, Pam (1983) Billie Sol: King of Texas Wheeler-Dealers Noble Craft Books,  Abilene, Texas, ; a sympathetic biography by his daughter
 Intergovernmental Relations Subcommittee (1966) Operations of Billie Sol Estes: Eighth Report by the Committee on Government Operations Intergovernmental Relations Subcommittee, House Committee on Government Operations, United States Congress, Government Printing Office, Washington, D.C., 
 Staff (May 25, 1962). "Investigations: Decline & Fall". Time. An account of the Billie Sol Estes scandal
  Also listed as JFK: autopsie d'un crime d'État, JFK:  autopsy of a state crime.  Estes's name is on the book's cover, but the Library of Congress catalogue does not credit him.

 Archival Manuscript Material 1 portfolio (32 photographic prints, 3 booklets, 5 text items)

1925 births
2013 deaths
20th-century American criminals
American businesspeople convicted of crimes
American confidence tricksters
American conspiracy theorists
American members of the Churches of Christ
American white-collar criminals
Businesspeople from Texas
John F. Kennedy conspiracy theorists
Lyndon B. Johnson
People associated with the assassination of John F. Kennedy
People from Abilene, Texas
People from Callahan County, Texas
People from Hood County, Texas
People from Reeves County, Texas
People in food and agriculture occupations
United States Merchant Mariners of World War II
Prisoners and detainees of the United States federal government
Prisoners and detainees of Texas
Texas Democrats
Writers from Texas